These are the official results of the Women's 4x100 metres event at the 1990 European Championships in Split, Yugoslavia, held at Stadion Poljud on 1 September 1990.

Medalists

Results

Final
1 September

Participation
According to an unofficial count, 32 athletes from 8 countries participated in the event.

 (4)
 (4)
 (4)
 (4)
 (4)
 (4)
 (4)
 (4)

See also
 1991 Women's World Championships 4 × 100 m Relay (Tokyo)
 1992 Women's Olympic 4 × 100 m Relay (Barcelona)
 1993 Women's World Championships 4 × 100 m Relay (Stuttgart)

References

 Results

Relay 4 x 100
Relays at the European Athletics Championships
1990 in women's athletics